Parhlo is a daily digital newspaper published in both English and Urdu languages. News articles on current affairs on Parhlo are published from a number of different cities on a daily basis simultaneously. Parhlo.com takes an unorthodox outlook on traditional journalism in Pakistan, encouraging citizen journalism via crowd-sourced content.

History
Founded by Yasir Shirazi and Irfan Burney, who teamed up with Shoaib Shamsi in 2014, Parhlo was a test-project for creating a youth-based publishing brand in Pakistan. Parhlo.com began when Yasir identified a lack of space for young writers in the publishing industry.

Content categories
Parhlo's 'Your Voice' features public provided content from all around the world. People bring their issues and opinions on different topics, including those regarded as taboo, onto the national stage through Parhlo's audience across different social media platforms. In the last 4 years, more than 8,500 writers have submitted their personal experiences, stories, and op-eds to Parhlo.com.

Apart from content submitted to its domain, Parhlo produces its own content on social issues, politics, entertainment, sports, business, technology, food, and many other categories.

Popular articles and Press coverage

Being one of the pioneers in Pakistan's digital space, Parhlo has gained significant traction on different social media forums over the years. Exclusive stories featured on Parhlo have been further shared by other publishing houses such as Dawn Aurora, Daily Pakistan, Siasat.pk, ARY News, and many others.

Some of the prominent articles by Parhlo include a satire piece on Humayun Saeed, playing the role of Islamabad in Money Heist. The article made Humayun Saeed respond to Parhlo. Other prominent articles and feats include Parhlo's coverage of the India-Pakistan standoff in February 2019. Parhlo has featured dozens of Pakistani celebrities in exclusive interviews, coverage and by promoting their work. Parhlo is widely cited by authors and writers in their work. The category that Parhlo is best known for is covering topics that traditional media has shied away from.

References

External links
Official website

Pakistani companies established in 2014
Pakistani entertainment websites